Cua or CUA may refer to:

Organizations
 Catholic University of America
 Canberra United Academy
 Center for Ultracold Atoms, a division of the MIT Physics Department in conjunction with Harvard University
 China United Airlines (ICAO airline designator)
 CUA (company), an abbreviated term for a credit union based in Brisbane, Queensland, Credit Union Australia.

Other uses
 Cua language
 Cúa, a city in Venezuela
 Cua, a form of Cai (surname), an ethnic Chinese surname
 Calciphylaxis, a syndrome affecting small blood vessels, also known as calcific uremic arteriolopathy (CUA)
 Cost–utility analysis, a form of economic analysis used to guide procurement decisions
 Common User Access, a specification for user-computer interfaces, written by IBM
 Compassionate Use Act, California Proposition 215
 CUA, a codon for the amino acid leucine